Juan Manuel del Mar Bernedo (December 29, 1805 – June 16, 1862) was a 19th-century Peruvian politician. He served as the 4th Vice President of Peru from October 1858 to June 1862.

References

 Basadre, Jorge: Historia de la República del Perú. 1822 - 1933, Octava Edición, corregida y aumentada. Tomo 4. Editada por el Diario "La República" de Lima y la Universidad "Ricardo Palma". Impreso en Santiago de Chile, 1998.
 Tauro del Pino, Alberto: Enciclopedia Ilustrada del Perú. Tercera Edición. Tomo 10. LLO/MEN.  Lima, PEISA, 2001. 
 Vargas Ugarte, Rubén: Historia General del Perú. La República (1844-1879). Noveno Tomo. Segunda Edición. Editor Carlos Milla Batres. Lima, Perú, 1984.

External links
 Portal Congreso de la República del Perú: Mensaje ante el Congreso, 29.09.1859.

1805 births
1862 deaths
People from Cusco
Vice presidents of Peru
Members of the Chamber of Deputies of Peru
Peruvian Ministers of Interior
Peruvian Ministers of Justice
Members of the Senate of Peru